Fungi are capable of a variety of behaviors. Nearly all secrete chemicals, and some of these chemicals act as pheromones to  communicate with other individuals. Many of the most dramatic examples involve mechanisms to get fungal spores dispersed to new environments. In mushrooms, spores are propelled into the air space between the gills, where they are free to fall down and can then be carried by air currents. Other fungi shoot spores aimed at openings in their surroundings, sometimes reaching distances over a meter.

Fungi such as Phycomyces blakesleeanus employ a variety of sensory mechanisms to avoid obstacles as their fruiting body grows, growing against gravity, toward light (even on the darkest night), into wind, and away from physical obstacles (probably using a mechanism of chemical sounding).

Other fungi form constricting rings or adhesive knobs that trap nematodes, which the fungus then digests.

One hormone that is used by many fungi is Cyclic adenosine monophosphate (cAMP).

See also
 Chemotaxis

References

Fungus ecology
Behavioral ecology